The Slave Trade Felony Act 1811 (51 Geo. III, c. 23) was a piece of British legislation that made engagement in the slave trade a felony. The earlier Slave Trade Act 1807 merely imposed fines that were insufficient to deter entrepreneurs from engaging in such a profitable business. The contexts in which it could be applied and how these sat within international criminal law gave rise to controversy. Henry Brougham was the principal proponent of the act.

The first case brought under the act was that of Samuel Samo, who was tried by Chief Justice Robert Thorpe at the Vice-Admiralty Court in Freetown, Sierra Leone. The case was heard from 8 April to 11 April 1812.

See also
 Slave Trade Acts

References

United Kingdom Acts of Parliament 1811
Slave trade legislation
Abolitionism in the United Kingdom